Pablo Manavello (May 21, 1950 – January 18, 2016) was an Italian-born Venezuelan composer, guitarist, singer and songwriter.

Manavello started his career in the early 1970s in Caracas and participated in more than 50 albums (including his own). He also worked for many Hispanic artists such as Ricardo Montaner, Chayanne, Carlos Vives, Shakira, Ricky Martin, Antonio De Carlo, Soraya, Melissa, Paralamas, and many others, and scored films and TV shows.

Manavello began his career in the mid-1960s with Los Memphis, a pop-rock band from Caracas influenced by The Beatles. Los Memphis released their first album in 1967 and another one in 1969 before disbanding. Later he founded Sangre, which released a self-titled album 1971. He worked as a session musician before collaborating with Juan Michelena in the protest album "Dicen que soy..." in 1977 and joining Vytas Brenner's Venezuelan fusion band Ofrenda.

In 1979 he released Cosas Sencillas, his first solo album and began a successful career as composer and producer of many Latin artists and bands. He then interrupted his career after receiving a scholarship from the Venezuelan Government to study film scoring in Berklee College of Music. He graduated in 1982, and by the late 80s became one of the top Latin music producers.

His debut as composer and producer was in Ricardo Montaner's first album in 1986. That album was certified multi-platinum in Venezuela and reached #1 on the Billboard Latin Pop Albums chart. Afterward, he worked as producer and composer for other Venezuelan acts like Melissa, Kiara and Ilan Chester.

Thereafter, Manavello moved to Miami, Florida, where he continued to produce records for Olga Tañón and Luis Fonsi, among others.

Discography

Albums

External links 
 Biography by Universal Music Publishing Group (UMPG)
 Pablo Manavello's biography at La Venciclopedia

1950 births
2016 deaths
Italian emigrants to Venezuela
Male composers
Singers from Caracas
Pop pianists
Venezuelan composers
Venezuelan guitarists
Venezuelan pop singers
Venezuelan record producers
Venezuelan songwriters
Male songwriters
Latin music songwriters
Male pianists
20th-century Venezuelan male singers
20th-century guitarists
20th-century composers
Male guitarists